Place de la Bourse is a station located on line  of the tramway de Bordeaux in France.

Situation
The station is located on the quay of Maréchal Lyautey, at place de la Bourse in Bordeaux. The station is not equipped with shelters nor does it distributes tickets, so as not to disfigure the historic facades of the Place de la Bourse.

Junctions
There are no junctions with other tram lines or buses at this station.

Close by
 Place de la Bourse
 Tribunal de Commerce
 Les quais
 Parking Place de la Bourse
 Miroir d'eau

See also
 TBC
 Tramway de Bordeaux

Bordeaux tramway stops
Tram stops in Bordeaux
Railway stations in France opened in 2004